In 2021 NASCAR will sanction three national series:
2021 NASCAR Cup Series – the top racing series in NASCAR
2021 NASCAR Xfinity Series – the second-highest racing series in NASCAR
2021 NASCAR Camping World Truck Series – the third-highest racing series in NASCAR

 
NASCAR seasons